Michele D. Presnell (born March 5, 1952) is a former Republican member of the North Carolina General Assembly from Yancey County. She represented the 118th district in the North Carolina House from 2013 until 2021.

Honors

In 2018, Presnell was listed as a Champion of the Family in the NC Values Coalition Scorecard.

References

External links

Living people
Republican Party members of the North Carolina House of Representatives
Women state legislators in North Carolina
21st-century American politicians
1952 births
21st-century American women politicians